The Eighth Garchen Rinpoche (Tib. མགར་ཆེན་རིན་པོ་ཆེ་), also called Garchen Triptrul Rinpoche (Tib. མགར་ཆེན་ཁྲི་སྤྲུལ་རིན་པོ་ཆེ་), is a Tibetan Buddhist teacher in the Drikung Kagyu lineage. Born April 1936 in Nangchen, Kham, he is believed to be an incarnation of Siddha Gar Chodingpa, a heart-disciple of Jigten Sumgön, founder of the Drikung Kagyu lineage in the thirteenth century CE. He is also believed to have incarnated as Mahasiddha Aryadeva in ancient India - the lotus-born disciple of Nagarjuna himself. He was known as Lonpo Gar, the minister of Tibetan dharma king Songtsen Gampo in the seventh century CE.

Biography
Garchen Rinpoche was seven years old he when he was brought to Lho Miyal Monastery and given the ordination name of Könchok Gyaltsen (Tib. དཀོན་མཆོག་རྒྱལ་མཚན་).  There he was recognized by Drikung Kyabgon Zhiwe Lodro, the 36th throne holder of the Drikung Kagyu lineage, where he was instructed by Siddha Chime Dorje and other high lamas of the Drikung Kagyu Lineage. At the age of 19, Garchen Rinpoche entered into a three year retreat which was interrupted after two and a half years due to the Cultural Revolution in China.

When he was 22 he was imprisoned by the Chinese for 20 years and put in a labor camp. During that time he met with Khenpo Munsel who became his root guru. Khenpo Munsel was a Nyingma master who taught him during the whole 20 years of his imprisonment. During that time, while enduring the labor camp hardships, Garchen Rinpoche kept on practicing in secret, according to his guru's instructions until he achieved the wisdom-mind which Khenpo Musel called "an emanation of a Bodhisattva".

Garchen Rinpoche was released from prison in 1979. As soon as he was released, he took it upon himself to rebuild the Drikung Kagyu monasteries, reestablish the Buddhist teachings, and build two boarding schools for local children in eastern Tibet.

Garchen Rinpoche first came to North America in 1997, teaching in Canada and the United States.

Current activities and expertise
Garchen Rinpoche is the founder and spiritual director of the Garchen Buddhist Institute in Chino Valley, Arizona, the Drikung Mahayana Center in North Potomac, Maryland and Gar Drolma Choling in Dayton, Ohio. Rinpoche is also the spiritual director of many other Dharma centers and teaches throughout North America, Asia, and Europe. Starting in 2020, because of his age, Rinpoche stopped traveling to different Dharma centers all over the world, and retired at his main seat, the Garchen Buddhist Institute. He has been giving teachings and holding Dharma events there since then, including online streaming for these.

He widely promotes Thogme Zangpo's Thirty-Seven Practices of a Bodhisattva and White Tara practice.

References

External links
 Garchen Buddhist Institute
 Gar Drolma Buddhist Center
  Garchen Rinpoche Biography Official Site
  Garchen Rinpoche Documentary Film: Blu-ray / DVD
 Full online film (1hr 40mins): "For the Benefit of All Beings, the Extraordinary Life of Garchen Triptrul Rinpoche"

1936 births
Living people
Buddhist monks from Tibet
Drikung Kagyu lamas
Drikung Kagyu tulkus
Lamas from Tibet
Rinpoches
Tibetan Buddhist spiritual teachers